Gulbadin Naib (born 16 March 1991) is an Afghan cricketer. Naib plays as an all-rounder, and is a right-handed batsman who bowls right-arm fast-medium. In April 2019, the Afghanistan Cricket Board (ACB) named Naib as the team's new One Day International (ODI) captain ahead of the 2019 Cricket World Cup, replacing Asghar Afghan. However, following the Cricket World Cup, where Afghanistan lost all of their matches, Rashid Khan was named as the new captain of the Afghanistan cricket team across all three formats.

Early life and career
Gulbadin Naib was born in Puli Alam in the Logar Province of Afghanistan. He made his debut for Afghanistan against Japan in the 2008 World Cricket League Division Five, where he made five appearances. He took part in the documentary Out of the Ashes which followed the team's preparation for the tournament and their lives back in Afghanistan; Naib is shown body building in a Kabul gym and stating Arnold Schwarzenegger to be one of his inspirations. Two years after the filming of the documentary, following which Naib lost his place in the Afghan side, he was selected as part of Afghanistan's squad for the 2010 Asian Games, playing a single match in the games against Hong Kong. Afghanistan won the silver medal in the competition. He made his List A debut for Afghanistan when they became the first side to tour Pakistan since the 2009 attack on the Sri Lanka national cricket team. Naib played in two of the three unofficial One Day Internationals (ODIs) against Pakistan A.

International career
Naib made his One Day International debut against Canada in the 2011–13 ICC Intercontinental Cup One-Day. Later in the tour he made his Twenty20 debut against Trinidad and Tobago in the Cricket Canada Summer Festival, making a further appearance during the festival against Canada. Later in 2011, he played for the newly formed Afghan Cheetahs team in the Faysal Bank Twenty-20 Cup 2011-12, making three appearances in the competition against Rawalpindi Rams, Faisalabad Wolves and Multan Tigers. He scored his maiden Twenty20 half century during the tournament, scoring 68 from 42 balls against Faisalabad Wolves. In December 2011, his score of 57 runs from 50 balls in the final of the 2011 ACC Twenty20 Cup helped Afghanistan to an 8-run victory over Hong Kong, securing Afghanistan their third ACC Twenty20 Cup title.

Naib later featured in Afghanistan's first One Day International against a Full Member Test-playing nation when they played Pakistan at Sharjah in February 2012. Naib scored 7 runs in the match, before becoming one of Shahid Afridi's five wickets. Pakistan won the encounter by 7 wickets. He was selected as part of Afghanistan's fourteen man squad for the 2012 World Twenty20 Qualifier held in the United Arab Emirates in March 2012. During this tournament, Naib made his Twenty20 International (T20I) debut against the Netherlands, and made two further T20I appearances, as well as subsequently playing a further six Twenty20 matches against nations in the qualifier who themselves did not hold Twenty20 International status. He scored 86 runs in the qualifier, at an average of 13.50, with a high score of 26 not out. Shortly after the tournament, he featured in two ODIs against the Netherlands in the World Cricket League Championship.

In July 2012, Naib was selected as part of Afghanistan's squad for their tour of Ireland as part of their Intercontinental Cup commitments. He played in both of the team's World Cricket League Championship ODIs against Ireland. Although the first match was abandoned due to rain, in the second match he claimed his maiden ODI wicket when he dismissed Niall O'Brien, and scored 19 runs from 23 balls before being dismissed by George Dockrell, Ireland winning the match by 59 runs. He also made his first-class debut during the tour in the Intercontinental Cup fixture, which saw Naib dismissed for 13 runs in his only innings of the match by Alex Cusack, while in Ireland's first-innings he took the wicket of Andrew Balbirnie to finish with figures of one for 33 from six overs. In August 2012, Naib featured in Afghanistan's second ODI against a full-member when they played Australia at Sharjah. In Australia's first-innings of 272/8, he bowled two overs which conceded 18 runs, and during the innings he ran out David Hussey. In Afghanistan's chase, he scored a quickfire 22 from 17 balls, which included three sixes, before he was dismissed by James Pattinson, Australia winning by 66 runs. During the match, Naib was named in Afghanistan's squad for the World Twenty20 in Sri Lanka in September 2012. He scored 44 against England, and was the only Afghan batsman to pass double figures as the English won by 119 runs.

In April 2019, he was named as the captain of Afghanistan's squad for the 2019 Cricket World Cup. In May, just ahead of the World Cup, in the second ODI against Ireland, Naib took six wickets for 43 runs. It was his first five-wicket haul and the third-best figures by a bowler for Afghanistan in ODIs. On 24 June 2019, in the match against Bangladesh, Naib played in his 100th international match for Afghanistan. In the same match, he also scored his 1,000th run in ODI cricket.

In September 2021, he was named in Afghanistan's squad for the 2021 ICC Men's T20 World Cup.

T20 franchise career
In September 2018, Naib was named in Balkh's squad in the first edition of the Afghanistan Premier League tournament. The following month, he was named in the squad for the Sylhet Sixers team, following the draft for the 2018–19 Bangladesh Premier League.

References

External links

1991 births
Living people
People from Logar Province
Afghan cricketers
Asian Games silver medalists for Afghanistan
Asian Games medalists in cricket
Cricketers at the 2010 Asian Games
Cricketers at the 2014 Asian Games
Afghanistan One Day International cricketers
Afghan Cheetahs cricketers
Afghanistan Twenty20 International cricketers
Pashtun people
Cricketers at the 2015 Cricket World Cup
Cricketers at the 2019 Cricket World Cup
Medalists at the 2010 Asian Games
Medalists at the 2014 Asian Games
Boost Defenders cricketers
Balkh Legends cricketers
Sylhet Strikers cricketers
Afghan cricket captains